Jangipur College, established in 1950, is a college in Jangipur, Murshidabad, West Bengal, India. It offers undergraduate courses in arts, commerce and sciences. It is affiliated to  University of Kalyani.

Departments

Science

Chemistry
Physics
Mathematics
Botany
Zoology

Arts and Commerce

Bengali
English
History
Geography
Political Science
Philosophy
Economics
Commerce

Accreditation
Jangipur College was awarded B++ grade by the National Assessment and Accreditation Council (NAAC). The college is recognized by the University Grants Commission (UGC).

See also

References

External links
 
University of Kalyani
University Grants Commission
National Assessment and Accreditation Council

Colleges affiliated to University of Kalyani
Educational institutions established in 1950
Universities and colleges in Murshidabad district
1950 establishments in West Bengal